Events from the year 1354 in Ireland.

Incumbent
Lord: Edward III

Events

Births

Deaths
 Edmund de Grimsby, an English cleric, Crown official and judge. While his career in Ireland lasted only about a year, he is notable as having been the first Master of the Rolls in Ireland.

References

 
1350s in Ireland
Ireland
Years of the 14th century in Ireland